Wang Xuehan (Chinese: 王雪涵; pinyin: Wáng Xuěhán; born June 1, 1998) is a Chinese pair skater. With partner Wang Lei, she is a bronze medalist at three Grand Prix events – 2014 Trophée Éric Bompard, 2014 Cup of China, and 2016 NHK Trophy – and the 2016 Chinese national champion.

Personal life 
Wang was born on June 1, 1998, in Beijing. Her mother teaches English.

Career

Parternship with Wang 
Wang started skating in 2005 at a rink in a shopping mall. Her partnership with Wang Lei began in 2012. The pair won the bronze medal at the 2013 Chinese Championships.

Making their Grand Prix debut, the Wangs placed fourth at the 2013 Cup of China. They finished fourth at the 2014 Chinese Championships.

The following season, the Wangs were awarded bronze at both of their Grand Prix events – 2014 Cup of China and 2014 Trophée Éric Bompard. They took the silver medal at the 2015 Chinese Championships.

In the 2015–16 season, the pair placed fifth at the 2015 Skate America and fourth at the 2015 Cup of China. They were selected to compete at their first ISU Championship – the 2016 Worlds in Boston. Ranked 15th in the short program and 14th in the free skate, they finished 15th overall.

They were fourth at the 2016 Cup of China and won the bronze medal at the 2016 NHK Trophy. Due to injury, they did not compete again until the 2018-19 Chinese National Games, where they placed second.

In September 2020, it was announced that Wang and Wang had split.

Programs 
(with Wang Lei)

Competitive highlights 
GP: Grand Prix

With Wang

Detailed Results 
(Small medals for short and free programs awarded only at ISU Championships – Worlds and Four Continents. At team events, medals awarded for team results only.)

With Wang

References

External links 
 

1998 births
Chinese female pair skaters
Living people
Figure skaters from Beijing